Marius Jaccard (27 March 1898 – 19 January 1978) was a Swiss ice hockey player who competed in the 1920 Summer Olympics and in the 1924 Winter Olympics. In 1920 he participated with the Swiss ice hockey team in the Summer Olympics tournament. Four years later he was also a member of the Swiss team in the first Winter Olympics tournament.

References

External links
 
Marius Jaccard's profile at Sports Reference.com

1898 births
1978 deaths
Ice hockey people from Geneva
Ice hockey players at the 1920 Summer Olympics
Ice hockey players at the 1924 Winter Olympics
Lausanne HC players
Olympic ice hockey players of Switzerland